Guilherme Ribeiro Félix (born April 8, 1990) is a Brazilian footballer, currently playing for Dayton Dutch Lions in the USL Professional Division.

Career
His career includes time with Brazilian sides Trieste FC, Goiás, and Atlético Mogi. He also had a stint with Metalurh Zaporizhzhia in Ukraine, but is best known for his time at Cortiba in Brazil, where he played from 2008 to 2010.

References

External links
 Dayton Dutch Lions profile

1990 births
Living people
Brazilian footballers
Dayton Dutch Lions players
USL Championship players
Association football forwards